Cees Priem (born 27 October 1950) is a retired Dutch professional road bicycle racer. After his cycling career, Priem became team manager of TVM. He competed in the individual road race and team time trial events at the 1972 Summer Olympics.

Major results

1968
 2nd De Vlaamse Pijl
1970
 1st Ronde van Midden-Zeeland
1971
 1st Overall Olympia's Tour
 1st Stages 2, 3 & 6 Tour of Austria
 3rd Ronde van Limburg
1972
 1st Overall 
 1st Stages 2 (TTT) & 6 Milk Race
 1st Stage 8 Tour de l'Avenir
1973
 1st Ster van Zwolle
 1st Stage 2 Olympia's Tour
 6th Overall Tour du Nord
1974
 1st  Road race, National Road Championships
 1st Ronde van Gelderland
 1st Stage 2 Tour de Romandie
 5th Nationale Sluitingprijs
 7th Overall Étoile des Espoirs
 8th Kuurne–Brussels–Kuurne
1975
 1st Dwars door België
 1st Stage 1a Tour de France
 2nd Ronde van Limburg
 6th Overall Tour of Belgium
 7th Overall Giro di Sardegna
 7th Grand Prix de Fourmies
 9th Paris–Brussels
 10th Paris–Tours
1976
 1st Stage 14 Vuelta a España
 4th Dwars door België
1977
 1st Stage 10 Vuelta a España
 3rd Overall Tour of Belgium
 5th Overall Three Days of De Panne
1st Prologue (TTT)
 5th Grote Prijs Jef Scherens
 5th Bordeaux–Paris
 8th Paris–Tours
1978
 1st Grote Prijs Stad Sint-Niklaas
 1st Stage 2 Tour of Belgium
 1st Stage 3 Ronde van Nederland
 1st Stage 1 Tour of Britain
 3rd Overall Three Days of De Panne
 8th Grand Prix de Monaco
1979
 1st Stabe 1b (TTT) Paris–Nice
 1st Stage 6 (TTT) Ronde van Nederland
 4th Paris–Brussels
 9th Paris–Tours
 10th Overall Tour Méditerranéen
1st Stage 1
1980
 1st Stages 7a (TTT) 10 Tour de France
 2nd 
 3rd Ronde van Midden-Zeeland
1981
 1st Stages 1b (TTT) & 4 (TTT) Tour de France
 1st Stage 5a (TTT) Tour of Belgium
 2nd Dwars door België
1982
 1st  Overall Étoile de Bessèges
1st Stage 1
 5th Overall Ronde van Nederland
1st Stage 6b (TTT)
 8th Dwars door België
1983
 1st  Overall Three Days of De Panne
 2nd Grand Prix La Marseillaise
 7th Kuurne–Brussels–Kuurne
1984
 1st GP Stad Vilvoorde
 6th Omloop van het Houtland

See also
 List of Dutch Olympic cyclists

References

External links 

Official Tour de France results for Cees Priem

1950 births
Living people
Dutch male cyclists
Dutch Tour de France stage winners
Dutch Vuelta a España stage winners
Cyclists at the 1972 Summer Olympics
Olympic cyclists of the Netherlands
Sportspeople from Borsele
Cyclists from Zeeland